Constance Lake 92 is a First Nations reserve in Cochrane District, Ontario. It is one of the reserves of the Constance Lake First Nation.

References

Oji-Cree reserves in Ontario
Municipalities in Cochrane District